John Putnam may refer to:
 John Putnam (comics), art director and designer of Mad magazine
 John Bishop Putnam, treasurer and director of the book publishing firm G.P. Putnam & Sons.
 John Day Putnam, member of the Wisconsin State Assembly
 J. Pickering Putnam, American architect and designer
 John Putnam (c. 1580–1666), founder of the colonial American Putnam family